Kim Jin-gyu (born 24 February 1997) is a South Korean footballer who plays as a midfielder for Gimcheon Sangmu and the South Korea national team.

Career
Kim signed a professional contract with Busan IPark in January 2015. Kim made his debut for the club on 4 July 2015 in a 1–0 defeat to Seongnam FC. He scored his professional debut goal on 27 July against Daejeon Citizens to become the youngest goal scorer in the K League 1.

Under Choi Yun-kyum in 2018, Kim featured regularly on the left side of a front three. However, Choi's replacement Cho Deok-je preferred to use Kim in central midfield. Under Cho, Kim was a regular for the side that went on to gain promotion to the K League 1.

In January 2020, Kim played for the South Korea U-23 team at the AFC U23 Championship. The team won the tournament to qualify for the 2020 Summer Olympics.

In July 2021, Kim was named in the final squad for the 2020 Summer Olympics. He made three appearances in South Korea's run to the quarter finals.

On 17 March 2022, Jeonbuk Hyundai Motors announced the official signing of Kim. He made his debut game for Jeonbuk Hyundai on 19 March 2022 in a draw against Gimcheon Sangmu.

Club career statistics
As of 4 March 2023

1Includes K League Promotion-Relegation Playoffs and AFC Champions League.

International goals
Scores and results list South Korea's goal tally first, score column indicates score after each Kim goal.

Honours

Club 
Jeonbuk Hyundai Motors
 Korean FA Cup: 2022

International
South Korea U23
AFC U-23 Championship: 2020

References

External links 

1997 births
Living people
People from Pohang
Association football midfielders
South Korean footballers
Busan IPark players
Jeonbuk Hyundai Motors players
K League 1 players
K League 2 players
Footballers at the 2020 Summer Olympics
Olympic footballers of South Korea
Sportspeople from North Gyeongsang Province